Estelle is a census-designated place (CDP) in Jefferson Parish, Louisiana, United States. The population was 17,952 in 2020. It is part of the New Orleans–Metairie–Kenner metropolitan statistical area.

Estelle is located south of Marrero; the urbanized areas of the communities meet, and some businesses in Estelle list their addresses as "Marrero". The Jean Lafitte National Park Barataria Preserve is adjacent to Estelle.

History
Part of the colonial era Isleño Barataria Settlement was in the southern part of what is now Estelle. Estelle became the location of the WWL-AM transmitter.

Geography
Estelle is located at  (29.847527, -90.108117). It is bordered to the north by Marrero and to the east by Woodmere.

Demographics

The 2019 American Community Survey estimated 17,968 people lived in the CDP, up from 16,377 at the 2010 U.S. census. At the 2020 United States census, there were 17,952 people in the CDP. In 2019, the racial and ethnic makeup was 50.5% non-Hispanic white, 26.6% Black or African American, 0.2% Native American, 6.2% Asian, 6.6% some other race, 3.5% multiracial, and 12.3% Hispanic and Latino American of any race. The 2020 census determined 47.18% of its population was non-Hispanic white, 27.77% Black or African American, 0.79% Native American, 5.58% Asian, 0.02% Pacific Islander, 4.66% two or more races, and 14.0% Hispanic and Latino American of any race. The growth of the Asian American and Hispanic or Latino American population in the CDP and others in Jefferson Parish have reflected the greater diversification of the U.S. following non-Hispanic white demographic decline. The median household income was $68,051 and 14.3% of the population were at or below the poverty line in 2019.

Education
Residents are assigned to schools in the Jefferson Parish Public Schools system.

Schools that serve Estelle for elementary school are Estelle Elementary, Allen Ellender PK-8, and Congetta Trippe Janet in Estelle, as well as Miller Wall Elementary in Marrero. Schools that serve Estelle for middle school are Ellender PK-8, Truman Middle in Estelle, and Worley Middle in Harvey. Most residents are zoned to John Ehret High School, while some are zoned to L.W. Higgins High School in Marrero. In regards to advanced studies academies, residents are zoned to the Marrero Academy.

Previously Ellender was solely a middle school, and Estelle was divided between Ellender and Truman at the middle school level. Therefore, Ellender did not serve any portions of Estelle at the elementary level.

References

Census-designated places in Louisiana
Census-designated places in Jefferson Parish, Louisiana
Census-designated places in New Orleans metropolitan area
Louisiana Isleño communities